Lake Township is one of sixteen townships in Cerro Gordo County, Iowa, USA.  As of the 2000 census, its population was 345.

Geography
According to the USGS, it contains one cemetery, Memorial Park. Lake Township includes the territory between Mason City and Clear Lake, the two largest cities in the county, and the only two that are not part of any township. Mason City Municipal Airport is located in Lake Township.

References

External links
 US-Counties.com
 City-Data.com

Townships in Cerro Gordo County, Iowa
Mason City, Iowa micropolitan area
Townships in Iowa